Robert Cook is an equine veterinarian. He has published many papers, mainly on diseases of the horse's mouth, ear, nose and throat both in scientific and horseman's journals, covering various topics:
equine diagnostical and surgical endoscopy
pulmonary origin of the "nose-bleeds" in  racehorses       (EIPH: Exercise induced pulmonary hemorrhage) and its relation with recurrent airway obstruction
anatomy and physiology of horse's upper airway
guttural pouch diseases
epiglottic entrapment
stride and respiration
recurrent laryngeal neuropathy (RLN)
dorsal displacement of the soft palate
laryngo-palatal dislocation 
headshaking syndrome and its relations with bit-related trigeminal neuralgia
physiological incompatibilities of a bit in the mouth of a working horse
role of the bit in the soft palate paresis at exercise and in asphyxia-induced pulmonary hemorrhage (EIPH)

Bridle patent

In 1997 Dr. Cook met Edward Allan Buck, inventor of the "original" bitless bridle in Del Mar, California.   Subsequent to that meeting Dr. Cook wrote articles and many letters regarding the bitless bridle. He then took the original design created by Buck and began presenting it as his own.

Since 1997, his main interest is the disadvantages and problems associated with using a bit in a horse's mouth. He proposes that the bit is the direct cause of many behavioural problems and diseases and that it exposes both the horse and the rider to serious risk. He concluded that the bit "is contraindicated, counterproductive and, in the wrong hands, potentially cruel ." He studied a new, patented type of bitless bridle and is now collecting more scientific evidence about its use and related prevention of horse problems and diseases.

External links
 Robert Cook official website

British veterinarians
Year of birth missing (living people)
Living people